Simon Aspelin (born 11 May 1974) is a former professional tennis doubles player from Sweden who turned professional in 1998. His success mainly came in doubles, winning 12 titles and reaching World No. 7 in March 2008. In men's doubles, Aspelin won the 2007 US Open and the Silver medal at the 2008 Summer Olympics.

A memorable part of Aspelin's career was when he and doubles partner Todd Perry were playing in the 2006 Wimbledon Championships men's doubles quarterfinals as the eighth-seeded doubles team against third-seeded Mark Knowles and Daniel Nestor. Knowles and Nestor won the match by winning the final set 23–21.

At the 2007 U.S. Open, seeded tenth with his partner Julian Knowle, Aspelin achieved the greatest triumph of his career by winning the U.S. Open, his first Grand Slam. In the first two rounds, they won against Kubot/Skoch and got a walkover over Calleri/Horna. They went on to upset the eighth seeds Jonathan Erlich and Andy Ram in the third round. In the quarterfinals, they shocked the top seeds Bob and Mike Bryan, having lost to them only weeks before. In the semifinal, they held off unseeded Julien Benneteau and Nicolas Mahut, before winning the final in two sets over the ninth seeds, Pavel Vízner and Lukáš Dlouhý. He had never before reached a Grand Slam semifinal. This win put them into the No. 5 position in the ATP Doubles Race, and also gave Aspelin his career-high ranking of No. 13. His Davis cup record in March 2009 is 3–5 in doubles.

Another notable performance in 2007 was the final against Knowles/Nestor in Tennis Masters Cup in Shanghai, which he lost with Julian Knowle.

In the 2008 Summer Olympics, he and fellow Swede Thomas Johansson defeated French pair Michaël Llodra and Arnaud Clément 7–6, 4–6, 19–17 in the semi-finals. The match that lasted 4 hours and 46 minutes. They went on to win the Silver medal.

Prior to his pro career, Aspelin competed for four seasons at Pepperdine University, in Malibu, Calif. He was one of just two Waves to earn All-American status all four seasons, and was inducted into the Pepperdine Hall of Fame in the fall of 2010.

In May 2011, he was inducted into the ITA Hall of Fame.

In July 2011, Aspelin announced his retirement from professional tennis. He played his last tournament in Båstad, where he reached the final but failed to claim his thirteenth ATP title.

Grand Slam finals

Doubles (1 title)

Olympics

Doubles: 1 (1 Silver)

Career finals

Doubles (12 wins, 21 losses)

Doubles Performance timeline

References

External links 

 
 
 

Swedish male tennis players
People from Nacka Municipality
1974 births
Living people
Olympic tennis players of Sweden
Tennis players at the 2008 Summer Olympics
Olympic silver medalists for Sweden
Olympic medalists in tennis
Grand Slam (tennis) champions in men's doubles
Medalists at the 2008 Summer Olympics
US Open (tennis) champions
Pepperdine Waves men's tennis players
Sportspeople from Stockholm County